TruTV is a Latin American pay television channel owned by Warner Bros. Discovery Entertainment. Its programming schedule is centred towards reality shows. It was launched on 1 April 2009 replacing Retro. It is divided in two feeds, one in Spanish language and another one in Portuguese language, for Brazil. In July 2010, an HD feed was launched.

History

As Retro 
The channel was launched as Retro in the region by "Claxson Interactive Group Latin America & Iberia" and aired classical series and movies. In 2007, it was bought, along with I.Sat and Space by Time Warner, but continued to air the same programming. On 25 March 2009, Turner Broadcasting System announced that "Retro" would be replaced by "truTV" on 1 April 2009 in order to get a new kind of audience. "truTV" is the first channel in the region to be 24-hours of investigation-based programming. All the programming from Retro was moved to Turner Classic Movies, also owned by Time Warner.

Transition to truTV
On April 1, 2009 at 8:30am UTC Retro aired its last show, an episode of the classic animated series Robotech, called Symphony of Light. At 9:00am UTC the channel changed to truTV. Since that date, the channel has been airing 24-hours without interruptions and in several countries of Latin America. The official website, however, was launched in June 2009, two months after the launch of the channel. truTV HD, a high definition version of the channel was launched in July 2010.

Programming
The networks has been adding more programming every month since its original launch.

Impractical Jokers
truTV Presents: World's Dumbest...
In Harm's Way
Ski Patrol
Remolcadores
Most Shocking
Speeders
Crisis Point
Inside
The Investigators
The Takedown
The Real Football Factories
L.A. Forensics
World's Toughest Cops
Most Daring
Trace Evidence
Ocean Force
Under Fire
Masterminds
Missing Persons Unit
Parco P.I.
Bait Car
Suburban Secrets
Party Heat
Rich & Reckless
Murder By The Book
North Mission Road
Body of Evidence
I Detective
US Bounty Hunters

Logos

See also
truTV
Turner Broadcasting System

References

Television channels and stations established in 2009